Robert "Bob" Cameron (born July 18, 1954) is a former Canadian football player who played 23 seasons (1980-2002) with the Winnipeg Blue Bombers of the Canadian Football League.

Cameron was a quarterback at Acadia University.  He won the Hec Crighton Trophy (most outstanding college football player in Canada). Cameron was drafted by the Edmonton Eskimos in the first round of the 1977 College Draft. He was converted to a punter with the Blue Bombers.

Bob Cameron remains the CFL's all-time leading punter with 134,301 regular season punting yards.  He was a CFL all-star 4 times, a divisional all-star 6 times, and helped the Bombers to three Grey Cup victories.  In the 1988 Grey Cup Cameron was named the game's Most Valuable Canadian for his effective punting in windy conditions.  Cameron is also considered the CFL's "iron man" by setting the record for consecutive games played with 353 in a row. One game more than the NFL record of 352 held by Jeff Feagles.   In 2005, he was named one of the Blue Bombers 20 All-Time Greats. He was elected into the Canadian Football Hall of Fame in 2010 and the Manitoba Sports Hall of Fame in 2011.

References

1954 births
Living people
Acadia Axemen football players
Canadian Football Hall of Fame inductees
Canadian football punters
Canadian football quarterbacks
Canadian people of Scottish descent
Edmonton Elks players
Sportspeople from Hamilton, Ontario
Players of Canadian football from Ontario
Winnipeg Blue Bombers players
Manitoba Sports Hall of Fame inductees